York Township is one of sixteen townships in Elkhart County, Indiana. As of the 2000 census, its population was 3,728.

History
York Township was named after the state of New York, the point of origin of many of its early settlers.

Bonneyville Mill was added to the National Register of Historic Places in 1976.

Geography
Hunter Lake is in this township.

Unincorporated towns
 Bonneyville Mills
 Vistula

Major highways

Cemeteries
The township contains one cemetery, Bonneyville.

References
 United States Census Bureau cartographic boundary files
 U.S. Board on Geographic Names

External links
 Indiana Township Association
 United Township Association of Indiana

Townships in Elkhart County, Indiana
Townships in Indiana